John Court (born 8 March 1943) is a British retired slalom canoeist who competed in the early 1970s. He entered, but did not start in the C-2 event at the 1972 Summer Olympics in Munich.

References
Sports-reference.com profile

1943 births
Canoeists at the 1972 Summer Olympics
Living people
Olympic canoeists of Great Britain
British male canoeists